Elie Adda (23 October 1892 – 11 August 1975) was an Egyptian fencer. He competed in the individual and team épée events at the 1928 Summer Olympics.

References

External links
 

1892 births
1975 deaths
Egyptian male épée fencers
Olympic fencers of Egypt
Fencers at the 1928 Summer Olympics